In 2001, there were 28 This American Life episodes.

Act 1: What Big Teeth You Have – Hillary Frank
Act 2: In the Event of an Emergency, Put Your Sister in an Upright Position – Susan Burton
Act 3: Yes There Is A Baby – Ira Glass
For their segment Yes There Is A Baby Jonathan Goldstein, Alex Blumberg and Ira Glass won the 2002 Third Coast International Audio Festival Gold Award for Best Documentary

Act 1: The Family That Flees Together, Trees Together – Alex Blumberg
Act 2: What's French for 'Strike Three'? – Adam Gopnik
Act 3: It's Julie Andrews' World, Sylvia Just Lives In It – Sylvia Lemus and Ira Glass

Act 1: Invisible Man vs. Hawkman – John Hodgman
Act 2: Wonder Woman – Kelly McEvers
Act 3: The Green Team of Boy Millionaires, Beppo The Amazing Supermonkey from Planet Krypton, and The Man from Sram – Ira Glass and Jonathan Morris
Act 4: The Wonder Twins – Ira Glass and Jason Bleibtreu

Act 1: Untouchables
Act 2: The Inevitable
Act 3: War By Other Means
Act 4: They Say Our Love is Here to Stay

Act 1: Once More, With Feeling – Jonathan Katz
Act 2: Punk in a Grey Flannel Suit – David Philp
Act 3: Ich... Bin... Ein .. Mophead – Alex Blumberg
Act 4: Every Day I Forget Something Else – Nicholson Baker

Act 1: The Test – Scott Carrier
Act 2: The Friendly Man – Scott Carrier
Act 3: Who Am I? What Am I Doing Here? – Scott Carrier
Act 4:  The Day Mom and Dad Fell in Love – Scott Carrier

Act 1: What We Cringe About When We Cringe About Love – Nancy Updike
Act 2: The Growing Aesthetic of Cringe – Adam Sternberg
Act 3: M*A*S*H Notes – Ira Glass
Act 4: Cringe and Purge – Bruce Jay Friedman

Act 1: Better Left to the Imagination – Alix Spiegel
Act 2: Tell it to the Void – Miriam Toews
Act 3: I'm an Orphan; Don't Tell My Mom – Starlee Kine
Act 4: Runaway Mom – Dan Savage

Act 1: Mr. Rothbart's Neighborhood – Davy Rothbart 
Music interlude: Bing Crosby, Dear Hearts and Gentle People
Act 2: The Girl Next Door – Cheryl Wagner 
Act 3: The Ratman Cometh – Katie Davis
Music interlude: Big Mama Thornton, I Smell a Rat
Music interlude: Jonathan Richman and the Modern Lovers, New Kind of Neighborhood

Act 1: Bowing Before the Famous – Ann Hepperman
Act 2: Thou Shalt Worship No Other Trousers Before Me – Ira Glass
Act 3: Don't Have a Golden Cow – Iggy Scam

For her segment Tornado Prom Susan Burton won the 2001 Third Coast International Audio Festival Best New Artist award
Act 1: Tornado Prom – Susan Burton
Act 2: Save the Last Dance for Me... Again – Ira Glass
Act 3: Only Two Things Are Certain in Life: Death and Tuxes
Act 4: Only One Thing Missing – Wendy Dorr – Prom in Racine, Wisconsin

Act 1: Driving the Divorcemobile
Act 2: And If That Diamond Ring Don't Shine – Ian Brown
Act 3: Legend of a Bankrobber's Son – Nick Flynn

Act 1: Baby Scientists with Faulty Data
Act 2: The Game Ain't Over til the Fatso Man Sings – Howie Chackowicz
Act 3: Werewolves in Their Youth – Michael Chabon
Act 4: One Brain Shrinks, Another Brain Grows – Julie Hill

Act 1: Part One – Alix Spiegel
Act 2: Part Two – Alix Spiegel

Act 1: Girls Girls Girls – Cris Beam
Act 2: Agent to the Stars – John Hodgman
Act 3: Airel Sharon, Shimon Peres, David Ben Gurion, and Me! – Ira Glass and Adam Davidson

Act 1: Just Three Thousand More Miles to the Beach – Scott Carrier
Act 2: It's Not the Heat, It's the Humility – Jonathan Goldstein
Act 3: You Can Have Your Cave and Eat It Too – Sarah Vowell

Act 1: Crispy with the Rock – Joel Lovell
Act 2: Know When to Walk Away, Know When to Run – Ira Glass
Act 3: Martha My Dear – David Rakoff

Act 1: The Disappearance – Genevieve Jurgensen
Act 2: Look for the Union Label – Adrian LeBlanc
Act 3: Ashes – David Sedaris

Act 1: In the After of Before and After – Lynn Simpson
Act 2: Watching from the River's Edge – David Rakoff
Act 3: Notes from the Underground – Haruki Murakami
Act 4: Far From Home – David Sedaris
Act 5: U.S.A., Me-S.A. – Ira Glass and Shirley Jahad

Act 1: The Situation in the Field – Ira Glass and Tom Gjelten
Act 2: Letters to Home – Andrew Carroll and Estelle Lynch
Act 3: What Peacetime Forgets About Wartime – Lee Sandlin
Act 4: Are You Ready? – Scott Carrier

Act 1: 1001 Arabian Nightly Newscasts – Julie Snyder
Act 2: Bombs over Baghdad – Issam Shukri
Act 3: Toto, I don't Think We're in Vietnam Anymore – Alex Blumberg

Act 1: Mr. Boder Vanishes – Carl Marziali
Act 2: Of Course I Remember Your Name – Heather O'Neill
Act 3: A Bad Day for Plates – Laura Tangusso
Act 4: You Call That Love? – Jonathan Goldstein

Act 1: To Make a Friend, Be a Friend – David Sedaris
Act 2: Stay in Touch – Tami Sagher
Act 3: People Like You If You Put a Lot of Time Into Your Appearance – Luke Burbank
Act 4: Just Be Yourself – Jonathan Goldstein

Act 1: Part One – Adam Beckman
Act 2: Part Two – Adam Beckman

Act 1: Don't Believe Anything You Hear on the Radio – Nancy Updike
Act 2: Live on Stage by the Sword, Die on Stage by the Sword – Margy Rochlin

Act 1: My Friend the Extremist – Jon Ronson
Act 2: Don't They Know It's Christmas After All – David Sedaris
Act 3: Newfies – Chris Brookes

Act 1: Adventures in Turning the Other Cheek – Ira Glass
Act 2: Does Size Matter If You're Talking About a Cross? – Josh Noel and Alex Blumberg
Act 3: The Epiphany Biz – Bill Lychak
Act 4: First Be Reconciled to Thy Brother, and Then Come and Offer Thy Gift – Susie Putz-Drury

External links
This American Lifes radio archive for 2001

2001
This American Life
This American Life